Mustafa Avcioğlu-Çakmak (19 December 1909 – 30 November 2009) was a Turkish wrestler. He competed at the 1936 Summer Olympics and the 1948 Summer Olympics.

References

External links
 

1909 births
2009 deaths
Turkish male sport wrestlers
Olympic wrestlers of Turkey
Wrestlers at the 1936 Summer Olympics
Wrestlers at the 1948 Summer Olympics
People from Sivas